Anatoma rainesi is a species of sea snail, a marine gastropod mollusk in the family Anatomidae.

Description

Distribution
This marine species occurs in the Pacific Ocean off Easter Island.

References

  Geiger D. 2003. Phylogenetic assessment of characters proposed for the generic classification of Recent Scissurellidae (Gastropoda : Vetigastropoda) with a description of one new genus and six new species from Easter Island and Australia. Molluscan Research 23(1): 21–83
 Geiger D.L. (2012) Monograph of the little slit shells. Volume 1. Introduction, Scissurellidae. pp. 1–728. Volume 2. Anatomidae, Larocheidae, Depressizonidae, Sutilizonidae, Temnocinclidae. pp. 729–1291. Santa Barbara Museum of Natural History Monographs Number 7

External links

Anatomidae
Gastropods described in 2003